Flowers of Fire (hangul: 불꽃) is a Korean anti-communist novel by Seonu Hwi, in 1957.

Plot

Characters 

 Old man Go (고 노인): very conservative old man. He always takes care of Hyun, but is primarily interested  in ancestral graveyard and topography.
 Yunho (연호): Communist, who unsuccessfully attempts to alter Hyun's ideology. Instead he takes hostage Hyun's Grandfather, Old man Go.
 Hyun (현): Main Character of Novel. Always show passive action. He steals Communist element's gun and runs away to a cave. Once there, Hyun awakes the 'Flame of Life' (생명의 불꽃), and decides to live properly.
 Hyun's Father (현의 아버지): When Hyun was young, he did Korean Independence Movement. However, he is killed by Japanese soldiers.
 Hyun's Mother (현의 어머니): Sincere Christian. She subjugates her pain to take care of Hyun.
 Aoyama (아오야마): Hyun's only Japanese friend. Later Day, Aoyama volunteer for Imperial away, he gave some potatoes to Hyun.
 Teacher Cho (조 선생): She and her father run away from North Korea under Communist rule, because her father rejects the control of communist party. Later, she sees Communist elements kill her father.
 Professor Tanaka (타나카 교수):

Awards 

Flowers of Fire won the Dong-in Literary Award (동인 문학상) in 1957.

English Translation 

"Flowers of Fire" appears in the anthology Flowers of Fire.

Books 

Seonu Hwi's novels have been well reviewed. They include:

 Bullgot (불꽃): Minuem-sa (민음사), 
 Bullgot - Sun U-Hwi; Danpyun-sun (불꽃 - 선우휘 단편선): Munhak-gwa Jisung sa (문학과 지성사), 
 Sun U-Hwi Jakpyun-sun (선우휘 작편선): Jimanji (지만지),

References

20th-century South Korean novels
1957 novels